Arabinda Muduli (1 September 1961 – 1 March 2018) was an Indian Odia musician, singer and lyricist. Muduli was born in Khanati, Khordha District, Odisha, India. He was a disciple of Bhikari Bal. He was a devotee of lord Jagannath.
He sang just bhajans and turned down offers to sing commercial movie songs.

Death
Muduli died of cardiac arrest in Bhubaneswar on 1 March 2018.

Awards
 "Swar Srikshetra", at the lion gate of Jagannath temple, Puri by the Governor of Odisha.
 Certificate of appreciation, Mumbai Odia Mahasangh, 2013

References

External links

1961 births
2018 deaths
People from Khordha district
Indian male singers